Vladislav Čáp (13 April 1926 — 30 December 2001) was a Czech figure skater who competed internationally for Czechoslovakia. He was the 1947 European silver medalist. He competed at the 1948 Winter Olympics and placed 10th.

Čáp graduated from the Czech Technical University in Prague. In 1958, he published a book on figure skating, Výklad pravidel krasobruslení. In 1959, he was arrested for alleged spying and sentenced to five years in prison. He was released after three and a half years. In 1969, he began working for Czechoslovak Television and lecturing on stage lighting at the Theatre Faculty of the Academy of Performing Arts in Prague.

Results

References

1926 births
2001 deaths
Czechoslovak male single skaters
Olympic figure skaters of Czechoslovakia
Figure skaters at the 1948 Winter Olympics
European Figure Skating Championships medalists